The new Belfast and Moosehead Lake Railroad (operated as the Belfast and Moosehead Lake Railway from 2009 to 2012) is a subsidiary of the Brooks Preservation Society (BPS), a not-for-profit organization established in 2008 to protect and preserve historic rail transportation infrastructure and assets located within Waldo County, Maine.

History
Following the announcement in February 2008 of the formal demise of the original 1867 chartered Belfast and Moosehead Lake Railroad Company (1871–2007) by its then private not-for-profit operator, the Belfast & Moosehead Lake Railroad & Preservation Society based in Unity, Maine, the BPS was incorporated as an all-volunteer non-profit 501(c)(3) organization to purchase the MEC-built 1892 B&MLRR station house in Brooks (MP 12.27) to save and preserve it as an historic railroad structure.

In the months that followed, the BPS acquired several pieces of surviving B&MLRR rolling stock including the road's two still operating 1940s vintage  GE diesel-electric locomotives: BML#50 that had been bought new by the road in November 1946 to provide the line the first non-steam power to ever operate over its  grade from Belfast to Burnham Junction, and BML#53 that had been acquired by the BML in 1970 from Vermont's Montpelier and Barre Railroad. A track inspection car, open-air observation car, 1926-vintage ex-DL&WRR Pullman-built chair car, ex-MEC stainless steel coach/cafe car, and an ex-MEC caboose were later added to the equipment roster.

In February 2009, the BPS entered into a lease agreement with the Maine Department of Transportation (MDOT) to operate over the State-owned  portion of BML grade running inland from the Belfast/Waldo town line (MP 3.14) to Burnham Junction (MP 33.07) and early that July began operating weekend excursion trains between Brooks (MP 12.27) and Waldo (MP 7.15). The following November the BPS leased the remaining  of grade within the Belfast city limits between the Belfast/Waldo town line and the Penobscot McCrum property line under the US Rt. 1 bridge from its still then owner, Unity Property Management (UPM). This permitted the BPS to establish regular seasonal excursion service from the Upper Bridge (MP 1.2) to Waldo.

In July 2010, the City of Belfast purchased the UPM-owned portion of the grade within the city limits in order to preserve the corridor and with the intention of developing it as a public multi-use rail trail. While exploring how to design and finance such a rail trail, however, the City also agreed to continue to lease that portion of the grade during the interim on a year-to-year basis to the BPS to operate seasonal trains inland from its Upper Bridge station.

After two seasons of operations from the Upper Bridge, however, the City cancelled the lease with the BPS in October 2012, and four months later formally applied to the Surface Transportation Board of the US Department of Transportation and the US Department of the Interior for permission under the National Trails System Act (16 USC§1241 et seq.)  to "railbank" their portion of the grade from the Belfast waterfront at Pierce Street up to the turnout to the privately owned City Point Central Railroad Museum at MP 2.5 next to the Oak Hill Road grade crossing.
 
The loss of the lease with the City forced the BPS to relocate the railroad's excursion train service in 2013 to the 19th century station house at the City Point Museum site, a property which the BPS subsequently purchased from its long-time private owner.

Between May and September 2016 extensive grading, paving, installation of railings and other physical upgrading work was undertaken along the corridor to complete its conversion to a formal pedestrian and bike trail called the "Passy Rail Trail".

Unity, Maine Operations

Passenger trains begin at the BML's headquarters in Unity, Maine. Regular trains depart at 11 a.m. and 1:30 p.m. These trains generally head west past Unity Pond, through the Burnham Bog, and then reverse back to Unity Station and Depot. Eastbound trains will terminate either at the Maine Organic Farmers and Gardeners Association Station in Thorndike, ME, or Farwell General Store, also located in Thorndike. Trains run nearly year round, with the winter season picking up in late February, and running through the winter holiday season.

Rail Bike rides are also operated in conjunction with normal trains, only during the summer season. These are pedal-powered carts that ride the rails, with accommodations for two riders per bike along with a baggage compartment.

Special event trains such as "The Great Train Robbery," "The Santa Express," and "Fall Foliage Special," run in addition to the normal rides. These are often extended rides, and typically run for a longer duration of time.

Present Day Preservation Efforts
Over the course of 2018–2021, the BML began acquiring several new pieces of Maintenance of Way equipment. Much was purchased through auction, along with in coordination with the Canadian Pacific Railway in Derby, ME. (Formerly the Central Maine and Quebec Railway). The railroad has been host to many elderly machines from the Bangor and Aroostook Railroad, Montreal, Maine and Atlantic Railway, Canadian American Railroad, and also CSX Transportation. Much of which has been repaired and refurbished for mainline operation, and has aided in tie renewal efforts by the BML, along with the Maine State DOT.

Recent achievements include tie renewal to the point of trackage being FRA Class 1 conditions from the line's western terminus at Burnham Junction, to Thorndike Yard, the location of one of the town's former chicken feed mills, ditching and culvert replacement along the entire rail corridor, tree clearing to allow for safe passage of trains, the full restoration of one former Maine Central Railroad Pullman passenger car, along with a Swedish State Railways dining car, the near full restoration of BML locomotive 53, and replacement and repair of several grade crossings.

Equipment

References

Heritage railroads in Maine
Maine railroads
Passenger rail transportation in Maine
Railway companies established in 2009
Transportation in Waldo County, Maine
Tourist attractions in Waldo County, Maine
American companies established in 2009
2009 establishments in Maine